Amarjit Singh Rana (born 3 February 1960 at Khusropur, Punjab) is a former field hockey player from India. He was part of the Indian hockey team which won the gold medal in hockey in the 1980 Summer Olympics at Moscow.

References

External links
 

1960 births
Living people
Indian male field hockey players
Olympic field hockey players of India
Olympic gold medalists for India
Olympic medalists in field hockey
Medalists at the 1980 Summer Olympics
Field hockey players at the 1980 Summer Olympics
Field hockey players from Punjab, India